William Gaines (1922–1992) was an American publisher, notably of Mad magazine.

William Gaines may also refer to:
William E. Gaines (1844–1912), U.S. Representative from Virginia
William Gaines (professor) (1933–2016), American journalist and professor
William Gaines (American football) (born 1971), American footballer
Bill Gaines (basketball) (born 1946), retired basketball guard
William Gaines (minister and community leader), a freed slave who was a minister and community representative during the Reconstruction Era in Georgia